Cepora licea (Nias gull) is a butterfly in the family Pieridae. It is found on Nias.

References

Pierini
Butterflies described in 1787